Wind of Change is a Bangladeshi music television series. It showcases a mix of local and international musicians performing together. It first premiered on Gaan Bangla during Eid al-Fitr in 2016. The series was created by Kaushik Hossain Taposh, who produces it with Farzana Munny.

Pre-Season 1
Pre-Season One of Wind of Change aired on 7 July 2016. The event was the first of its kind with an extravagant music arrangement conducted by Music Director Kaushik Hossain Taposh and featured various known international and local Bangladeshi artists. The platform changed the way live music programs are defined in Bangladesh and around the world through dynamic music arrangements by Taposh and mesmerizing, unique visuals directed by Farzana Munny. Pre-Season 1 featured 'Wind of Change Renditions' of legendary songs by artists/bands including Subir Nandi Ayub Bachchu, Miles, Habib Wahid, Chirkutt and more.

Pre Season 2
Pre-Season 2 of Wind of Change aired on 10 September 2016. This instalment featured an even broader range of instruments and artists from around the world with performances from renown artists such as Syed Abdul Hadi, Andrew Kishore, James and more.

Season 1
After two Pre-Seasons, 'Wind of Change' released Season 1 on 25 June 2017. The platform continued to grow in order to keep establishing itself as an international manifesto of cultural exchange and world-renowned musicians joined the revolution as seen in this season. Supported by One More Zero Group and heralded by TM Productions, the expansion aimed to keep enhancing the 'Wind of Change' experience as it sets its sights to be the new benchmark for musical fusion globally.

Season 2
The second season of 'Wind of Change' aired on the 31 August 2017. It continued to make a positive impact on the world by making music for goodwill and unity. This was carried out by inviting world renowned musicians to come together not just for music itself but the people and, by extension, the various cultures it affects.

Season 3
The third season of 'Wind of Change' aired on the 15 June 2018. Expanding on its goal of preserving songs that are culturally monumental, the platform also rejuvenated various unsung heroes of the Bangladeshi music industry from the past. Continuing the journey of success, season three featured artists like Andrew Kishore, Kiran Chandra Roy Agoon, Mizan, and Sumon.

Season 5 (2019)
The fifth season was aired on 6 June 2019. Renowned Bollywood singers like Aditi Singh Sharma, Kailash Kher, and Papon performed in this season. World-famous drummer Marco Minnemann and ex-Guns N' Roses guitarist Bumblefoot also performed here. All of the songs were re-composed by Kaushik Hossain Taposh.

Cast

 Adit
 Agun
 Jan-e Alam
 Rafiqul Alam
 Ayub Bachchu
 Sahana Bajpaie
 Balam
 Rezwana Choudhury Bannya
 Chisti Baul
 
 Nelli Bubujanca
 Sandip Chatterjee
 Purbayan Chatterjee
 Chirkutt
 Samina Chowdhury
 Ustad Niaz Mohammad Chowdhury
 Alicja Chrzaszcz
 Daniel Cressars
 Sanjoy Das
 Anton Davidyants
 Mohini Dey
 Anna Emelianova
 Mekaal Hasan
 Hasan
 Haider Hossain
 James
 Adelina Jureciva
 Pantha Kanai
 Arshad Khan (musician)|Arshad Khan
 Belal Khan
 Hridoy Khan
 Kailash Kher
 Andrew Krasilnikov
 Luipa
 Makhon
 Artyom Manukyan
 Miles
 Minar
 Marco Minnemann
 Aditi Mohsin
 Sujit Mostafa
 Fahmida Nabi
 Pathik Nabi
 Subir Nandi
 Papon
 Anthony James Parker
 Uppalapu Rajesh
 Anna Rakita
 Kiran Chandra Roy
 Senan
 Shamim
 Aditi Singh Sharma
 Rhythm Shaw
 Shirin
 Shivamoni
 Bari Siddiqui
 Sumon
 Kaushik Hossain Taposh
 Ron "Bumblefoot" Thal
 Valeri
 Anna Vibe
 Ferdous Wahid
 Habib Wahid
 Anna Wibe

List of episodes

Notes

References

Bangladeshi music television shows
Musical television series